James Alfred Davidson OBE (22 March 1921 – May 2004) was a British naval commander and diplomat. After serving during the Second World War, he joined the Commonwealth Relations Office where he held several posts in Cambodia, Brunei, Bangladesh and the British Virgin Islands.

Biography

Early life 
Davidson was born in 1922 and educated at Portsmouth Grammar School and Christ's Hospital, then at the Royal Naval College, Dartmouth. In 1943 he was appointed first lieutenant of the frigate . A year later, in February 1944, at the age of just 21, Davidson took temporary command of the ship. Davidson joined  a few months later, an Eastern Fleet destroyer which took part in the Battle of Penang.

Diplomatic career 
In 1951 he was posted as naval liaison officer to the Chinese Nationalist Government. He married his wife Daphne Merritt in 1955. He joined the Commonwealth Relations Office (CRO) in 1960. His first assignment was as first secretary in the newly independent Trinidad. In 1969, he was posted to Phnom Penh, Cambodia, where he witnessed the overthrow of Prince Sihanouk. He continued to serve until the Khmer Rouge fully took over the country.   

Davidson wrote a book on the region in 1979: Indo-China: Signposts in the Storm. He was appointed OBE in 1971. After the India-Pakistan war, he become deputy high commissioner in East Pakistan, which was soon become Bangladesh. In this position, Davidson took part in negotiations on Indira Gandhi's visit to Bangladesh in March 1972. His next two appointments were to Brunei as High Commissioner and as Governor of the British Virgin Islands.

Later life 
He retired from the Diplomatic Service in 1981. He continued to take up several other positions including as a visiting fellow at the London School of Economics he decided to do a pupillage at the Admiralty Bar. He was a member of the inquiry into the sinking of the MS European Gateway.

Bibliography

Honours 
James Davidson was given he honorary title of Yang Terutama (His Excellency) by the Government of Brunei. He has also earned the following honours; 
  Order of the British Empire Officer (OBE)

References 

1921 births
2004 deaths
Governors of the British Virgin Islands
Royal Navy officers of World War II
High Commissioners of the United Kingdom to Brunei
British expatriates in Cambodia
British expatriates in Bangladesh
Civil servants in the Commonwealth Relations Office
Officers of the Order of the British Empire
People educated at Christ's Hospital